Guan Ning (158–241), courtesy name You'an, was a Chinese writer of the state of Cao Wei during the Three Kingdoms period of China. He was from Zhuxu County (朱虛縣), Beihai Commandery, which is near present-day Linqu County, Shandong. His father died when he was 16. He was friends with Hua Xin and Bing Yuan (邴原).

See also
 Lists of people of the Three Kingdoms

References

 Chen, Shou (3rd century). Records of the Three Kingdoms (Sanguozhi).
 Pei, Songzhi (5th century). Annotations to Records of the Three Kingdoms (Sanguozhi zhu).

150s births
241 deaths
People of Cao Wei
Writers from Weifang